Broadway Cares: Home for the Holidays is a compilation holiday album by various artists, released in 2001.

Track listing
Liza Minnelli, Alan Cumming – Baby It's Cold Outside
Christine Ebersole – Have Yourself  Merry Little Christmas
Jane Krakowski – Santa Baby
Sam Harris – Merry Christmas Darling
Liz Callaway, Ann Hampton Callaway – O Holy Night
Anthony Rapp, Everett Bradley – Peace On Earth / Little Drummer Boy	
Lillias White – Silent Night
Adam Pasca – New York State of Mind	
Daphne Rubin-Vega – Feliz Navidada	
Billy Porter – Christmas Time Is Here
Lea Delaria – Sleigh Ride	
Patrick Wilson – We Need a Little Christmas	
Davis Gaines – Chestnuts Roasting on an Open Fire
Gary Beach, Roger Bart – Silver Bells	
Victor Garber – I'll Be Home for Christmas
Audra McDonald – White Christmas

References

2001 compilation albums
2001 Christmas albums